There are textual variants in the Hebrew Bible found in the Book of Leviticus.

Legend

List 

This list provides examples of known textual variants, and contains the following parameters: Hebrew texts written right to left, the Hebrew text romanised left to right, an approximate English translation, and which Hebrew manuscripts or critical editions of the Hebrew Bible this textual variant can be found in. Greek (Septuagint) and Latin (Vulgate) texts are written left to right, and not romanised. Sometimes additional translation or interpretation notes are added, with references to similar verses elsewhere, or in-depth articles on the topic in question.
 Leviticus 18 

Leviticus 18:4
  – WLC
  – LXX LXX
  – Brenton ABP
  –  
  – Vg.
 The verb servāre is the root of the word service; the verb ambulāre is the root of the word ambulance.

Leviticus 18:5
  – WLC
  – SP
 Compare Exodus 1:16 (last verb). It is unclear whether the verb(s) used for "to live" is/are H2421  chayah or H2421  chayay.
  – LXX LXX
  – Brenton ABP
  – 
  – 
  – Vg

Leviticus 18:5
  – WLC
  – LXX LXX ABP
  – Brenton
  – Vg

Leviticus 18:7
  –   
  – Vg

Leviticus 18:7
  – MT WLC
  – SP
  – LXX LXX Brenton ABP
  – 
  – Vg

Leviticus 18:7
  – LXX LXX Brenton
  – ABP
 omitted – 

Leviticus 18:8
  – 
  – Vg

Leviticus 18:9
  – WLC
  – LXX Brenton ABP
  – LXX
  – 
  – 
  – Vg

Leviticus 18:9
  – LXX  Brenton ABP
  – LXX 
  – 
  – Vg

Leviticus 18:9
  – 
 omitted – all other witnesses

Leviticus 18:10
  – Vg
 omitted – 

Leviticus 18:17
  – Brenton ABP (classical Greek spelling)
  – LXX LXX (Koine Greek spelling)

Leviticus 18:18
  – Brenton ABP (classical Greek spelling)
  – LXX LXX (Koine Greek spelling)

Leviticus 18:19
  – WLC
  – LXX ABP
  – 
  – 
  – Vg

Leviticus 18:19
  – WLC
  – Brenton ABP
  – LXX LXX
  –  Vg

Leviticus 18:20
  – 
  – Vg

Leviticus 18:20
  – WLC
  – LXX LXX Brenton ABP
  – 
  – Vg

Leviticus 18:21, see also Moloch § Biblical attestations and Child sacrifice § Ban in Leviticus
  – WLC
  – LXX LXX Brenton ABP
  – 
  – Vg

Leviticus 18:22, see also Leviticus 18 § Homosexuality
  – WLC
  – SP
  LXX
  ABP
  – 
 The word muliebrae is an incorrect declension of muliebris; genitive singular (muliebris, "of a woman", "of womanly") was likely the intended form, compare fēminīnae ("of a woman(ly)", "of feminine").
  – Robert Estienne (1545)
  – Vg Vg
 Compare Leviticus 20:13; Genesis 49:4.

Leviticus 18:23
  – WLC
  – LXX LXX Brenton
  – ABP
  – 
  – Vg

Leviticus 18:23
  – LXX LXX Brenton ABP
  – 
sēmentium is a Late Latin nonstandard noun for "seed".
 omitted – WLC Vg

Leviticus 18:25
  – Brenton ABP
  – LXX LXX

Leviticus 18:25
  – LXX Brenton ABP
  – LXX

Leviticus 18:26
  – LXX LXX Brenton 
  – ABP

Leviticus 18:26
  – LXX Brenton ABP
  – LXX

Leviticus 18:27
  – LXX LXX 
  – Brenton ABP

Leviticus 18:29
  – ABP  
 omitted – LXX LXX Brenton

Leviticus 18:30
  – LXX LXX Brenton 
  – ABP

Leviticus 18:30
  – LXX Brenton ABP
  – LXX

 Leviticus 20 
Leviticus 20:13
  – WLC
  – SP 
  – LXX
  – Brenton
  – ABP
  – Vg Vg
 Compare Leviticus 18:22; Genesis 49:4.

 Leviticus 25 
Leviticus 25:42, see also The Bible and slavery
  – WLC
  – LXX LXX Brenton ABP
  – 
  – Vg

Leviticus 25:42, see also The Bible and slavery
  – WLC
  – LXX LXX Brenton ABP
  – 
  – Vg

Leviticus 25:43, see also The Bible and slavery
  – WLC
  – LXX LXX Brenton 
  – ABP
  – 
  – Vg

Leviticus 25:44, see also The Bible and slavery
  – WLC
  – LXX LXX Brenton ABP
  – 
  – Vg

Leviticus 25:44, see also The Bible and slavery
  – WLC
  – LXX LXX Brenton ABP
  –  Vg

Leviticus 25:44, see also The Bible and slavery
  – WLC
  – LXX LXX Brenton ABP
  – 
 omitted – Vg

Leviticus 25:45, see also The Bible and slavery
  – WLC
  – ABP
 omitted – LXX LXX Brenton  Vg

See also 
 List of Hebrew Bible manuscripts

References

Bibliography 
 
 
 
 
 
 
  (E-book edition)
 
 Emanuel Tov, The Text-Critical Use of the Septuagint in Biblical Research (TCU), 1981 (1st edition), 1997 (2nd edition), 2015 (3rd edition).
 Emanuel Tov, Textual Criticism of the Hebrew Bible (TCHB), 1992 (1st edition), 2001 (2nd edition), 2012 (3rd edition).
 Emanuel Tov, Textual Criticism of the Hebrew Bible, Qumran, Septuagint: Collected Writings, Volume 3 (2015).

External links 
 Digitized Hebrew and Greek Manuscripts: Access and Issues – Introduction to online biblical textual studies

Biblical criticism
Early versions of the Bible
Book of Leviticus
Hebrew Bible versions and translations
Jewish manuscripts
Old Testament-related lists
Septuagint manuscripts
Textual criticism